Acrefair railway station was a former station on the Ruabon–Barmouth line in North East Wales. It closed to passengers on 18 January 1965 as part of the Beeching Axe.

History
Although built by the Vale of Llangollen Railway, its services were operated by the Great Western Railway from the outset. The line then passed on to the Western Region of British Railways on nationalisation in 1948, and was closed by the British Transport Commission.

The station was built at a high-level above King Street, close to its junction with Llangollen Road. The line was double track between Ruabon and Llangollen and there was a signal box at Acrefair. The Ruabon Brook Tramway, a goods line from the local coalfields and clay works to Froncysyllte, passed immediately below the station, crossing King Street at street level via a gated crossing.

According to the Official Handbook of Stations the classes of traffic being handled at this station in 1956 were G & P and there was a 3-ton crane.

The site today
The course of the line here is now an access road though a small industrial estate.

References

Sources

Further reading

External links
Pictures and plan of the station 
 Station on navigable O.S. map

Beeching closures in Wales
Disused railway stations in Wrexham County Borough
Railway stations in Great Britain opened in 1862
Railway stations in Great Britain closed in 1965
Former Great Western Railway stations
1862 establishments in Wales